The Sz.-Nagy dilation theorem (proved by Béla Szőkefalvi-Nagy) states that every contraction T on a Hilbert space H has a unitary dilation U to a Hilbert space K, containing H, with

Moreover, such a dilation is unique (up to unitary equivalence) when one assumes K is minimal, in the sense that the linear span of ∪nUnH is dense in K. When this minimality condition holds, U is called the minimal unitary dilation of T.

Proof 
For a contraction T (i.e.,, its defect operator DT is defined to be the (unique) positive square root DT = (I - T*T)½. In the special case that S is an isometry, DS* is a projector and DS=0, hence the following is an Sz. Nagy unitary dilation of S with the required polynomial functional calculus property:

Returning to the general case of a contraction T, every contraction T on a Hilbert space H has an isometric dilation, again with the calculus property, on

given by

Substituting the S thus constructed into the previous Sz.-Nagy unitary dilation for an isometry S, one obtains a unitary dilation for a contraction T:

Schaffer form 

The Schaffer form of a unitary Sz. Nagy dilation can be viewed as a beginning point for the characterization of all unitary dilations, with the required property, for a given contraction.

Remarks 

A generalisation of this theorem, by Berger, Foias and Lebow, shows that if X is a spectral set for T, and 

is a Dirichlet algebra, then T has a minimal normal δX dilation, of the form above. A consequence of this is that any operator with a simply connected spectral set X has a minimal normal δX dilation.

To see that this generalises Sz.-Nagy's theorem, note that contraction operators have the unit disc D as a spectral set, and that normal operators with spectrum in the unit circle δD are unitary.

References
 
 

Operator theory
Articles containing proofs
Theorems in functional analysis